The Korean Basketball League Playoffs Most Valuable Player Award (Playoffs MVP) (Korean: 플레이오프 MVP) is an annual Korean Basketball League (KBL) award given since 1997 to the best performing player of the playoffs.

At the conclusion of the regular season, the top two ranked teams automatically qualify for the semifinals while the third to sixth-ranked teams qualify for the quarterfinals stage. The award specifically recognizes players for their performances during the playoffs, without taking into account of their record during the regular season. The awardee is selected by press vote.

Hur Jae is the only player to have won the award as a member of the runner-up team. Future regular season MVPs Joo Hee-jung and Oh Se-keun both won the award during their rookie season.

Winners

Notes

References

External links
Records: Past records / 주요기록: 역대수상현황 on the Korean Basketball League official website 

Korean Basketball League awards